The Raunt was a former Long Island Rail Road station on the Rockaway Beach Branch. It had no address and no station house, because it was meant strictly as a dropping-off point for fishermen using a small island in Jamaica Bay. It was named for the channel on the south side of the island where it stood.

History

The Raunt station opened in 1888 by the New York and Rockaway Beach Railway. It had a wooden pedestrian bridge between the two sheltered platforms, and was electrified on July 26, 1905. The Jamaica Bay Trestle was prone to fires, but The Raunt was the source of a May 7–8, 1950 fire that broke out between here and Broad Channel, destroyed the bridge over Jamaica Bay and thus doomed the entire line. Service on the Rockaway Beach Branch west of Hammels continued only via the Far Rockaway Branch, until October 3, 1955, when the branch was abandoned west of Far Rockaway itself, along with the entire Rockaway Beach Branch south of Ozone Park.

Both branches were sold to the New York City Transit Authority, which replaced the Rockaway Beach Branch, and the Queens half of the Far Rockaway Branch with the IND Rockaway Line. The Broad Channel station was replaced in 1956 as a New York City Subway station, but the small community at The Raunt was ordered demolished by New York City parks commissioner Robert Moses and became part of the Jamaica Bay Wildlife Refuge.

References

External links
Arrt's Arrchives
Electrification of Rockaway Beach Branch from Ozone Park to Hammel's Wye
The Raunt Image
Former site of The Raunt station (Road and Rail Pictures)

Raunt, The
Railway stations in the United States opened in 1888
Railway stations closed in 1950
Raunt, The
1888 establishments in New York (state)
1950 disestablishments in New York (state)